Saint Maginus (Spanish: San Magín; Catalan: Sant Magí) was a Catalan hermit in the late third and early fourth centuries in Tarragona. Orphaned early, he was a hermit in a cave on Mount Brufaganya for thirty years.

Upon the arrival of the Roman prefect Dacian to Tarragona, persecuting Christians under the edict of Emperor Maximian, Maginus tried to convert them to the faith and was imprisoned. Freed miraculously, he left the city by a gate now called Sant Magí, where he dedicated a chapel and returned to Mount Brufaganya.

Captured in the cave again, he was taken to Tarragona and transferred to Gaià, where he was beheaded on 25 August 306.

He is the patron saint of Tarragona and his feast day is on August 19.

References

Sources

Translated from Spanish Wikipedia.

External links
 http://santmagi.ecervera.cat/presentacio3_1/_5G1ICS7tAW4CSxkeE83pfeiyiRVcz-l2VGLm7wMsPr7z4U6-SXMUuQ 

Saints from Hispania
Catalan Roman Catholic saints
Catholic martyrs
Hermits in the Roman Empire
Christians in the Roman Empire
306 deaths
Year of birth unknown